Ace of Wands may refer to:
 Ace of Wands (Tarot card), a Tarot card of the Minor Arcana
 Ace of Wands (TV series), British children's television show